Yury Valentinovich Kovalchuk (born 25 July 1951) is a Russian billionaire businessman and financier who is "reputed to be Vladimir Putin's personal banker". The Panama Papers leak revealed that Kovalchuk had transferred at least $1 billion to an offshore entity.

Kovalchuk is a close friend of Putin: he hosted the wedding of Putin's daughter Katerina Tikhonova to Kirill Shamalov at his ski resort, Igora, in 2013.

According to journalist Mikhail Zygar, Kovalchuk could probably be called Number 2 in today's Russia. While self-isolating from COVID-19 in 2020, Putin spent much time with Kovalchuk, and they share the view that the only important factor is to restore Russian greatness.

Life

From 1987 to 1991, he was the first deputy director of Ioffe Physico-Technical Institute.

In 1992, Kovalchuk was a founder of the STREAM Corporation.

Kovalchuk is very closely associated with Vladimir Stolyarenko.

Since the early 1990s, Kovalchuk has owned a dacha in Solovyovka in the Priozersky District of the Leningrad region, located on the eastern shore of the Komsomolskoye lake on the Karelian Isthmus near Saint Petersburg. His neighbours there are Vladimir Putin, Vladimir Yakunin, Andrei Fursenko, Sergey Fursenko, Viktor Myachin, Vladimir Smirnov and Nikolay Shamalov. Together they instituted the co-operative society Ozero (the Lake) which united their properties on 10 November 1996.

In November 2000, he was a main shareholder of the Brewery "Baltika". Since 2004, he has been chair of Rossiya Bank and its largest shareholder.

The May 2008 issue of Russian Forbes listed him for the first time in its Golden Hundred of Russia's richest, calling him and another new entrant to the List, Gennady Timchenko, "good acquaintances of Vladimir Putin." The magazine placed him at number 53 on the Russians-only list, with an estimated fortune of $1.9 billion. After sanctions imposed on Kovalchuk in 2018, this dropped to $650 million.

His elder brother Mikhail Kovalchuk is the scientific secretary of the Council for Science and High Technologies attached to the president of the Russian Federation.

In 2015, Yury Kovalchuk's National Media Group (NMG) and US Discovery Channel joined forces to form Media Alliance of which NMG owns 80%. Later that year, Kovalchuk acquired the rights to Ted Turner's Russian assets including the Russian version of CNN, Cartoon Network and Boomerang. The reason for the sale was based on the Russian media ownership law that limits ownership of Russian media by foreigners.

In 2017, Kovalchuk purchased the century-old Novy Svet vineyard in Crimea for $26.4 million in one of the first privatization deals in the region since the annexation of the region by Russia.

As of January 2019, Kovalchuk and Nikolai Shamalov through their ownership of Rossiya Bank have become the most important investors in Russia's development of annexed Crimea.

In 2020, the world's leading streaming entertainment service Netflix partnered with Kovalchuk's National Media Group to launch a local-language streaming service in Russia.

On 15 April 2021, Alexei Navalny's website stated that since 2003 Kovalchuk is the owner of Putin's residence at Valdai which is on the southern  of a peninsula between Lake Uzhin and Lake Valdai in the Novgorod Oblast near Saint Petersburg and is across Lake Valdai from Valday. Often, Putin's Dacha, which was built in 1980, is called Valdai, Dolgie Borody, or Stalin's Dacha, but Stalin was not alive when Valdai was built. Abutting north of this location is  owned by the Russian Federation and is frequented by the Federal Security Service. Kovalchuk leases Putin's Dacha to the Russian government for an undisclosed price.

Sanctions
Kovalchuk was one of several individuals sanctioned by the U.S. Treasury Department on 20 March 2014 in response to the 2014 Crimean crisis.  According to the U.S. Treasury, Kovalchuk is a close advisor to President Putin and has been referred to as one of his "cashiers".

Notes

References and notes

See also
List of Russian people by net worth
List of individuals sanctioned during the Ukrainian crisis

1951 births
Living people
Russian Jews
Businesspeople from Saint Petersburg
Russian billionaires
Former billionaires
Russian individuals subject to the U.S. Department of the Treasury sanctions
Russian individuals subject to European Union sanctions
Russian individuals subject to United Kingdom sanctions